Jean Sala Breitenstein (July 18, 1900 – January 30, 1986) was a United States circuit judge of the United States Court of Appeals for the Tenth Circuit and previously was a United States district judge of the United States District Court for the District of Colorado.

Education and career
Born in Keokuk, Iowa and moved to Boulder, Colorado in 1907 where he attended public schools. He served in the United States Army towards the end of World War I, in 1918 and was a private. He thereafter received an Artium Baccalaureus degree from the University of Colorado Boulder in 1922 and a Bachelor of Laws from the University of Colorado School of Law in 1924. He was an assistant state attorney general of Colorado from 1925 to 1929. and an Assistant United States Attorney for the District of the Colorado from 1930 to 1933. He was in private practice in Denver, Colorado from 1933 to 1954.

Federal judicial service

Breitenstein was nominated by President Dwight D. Eisenhower on April 6, 1954, to the United States District Court for the District of Colorado, to a new seat authorized by 68 Stat. 8. He was confirmed by the United States Senate on April 23, 1954, and received his commission on April 27, 1954. His service terminated on July 9, 1957, due to his elevation to the Tenth Circuit.

Breitenstein was nominated by President Eisenhower on June 5, 1957, to a seat on the United States Court of Appeals for the Tenth Circuit vacated by Judge Walter A. Huxman. He was confirmed by the Senate on June 26, 1957, and received his commission the next day. He assumed senior status on July 31, 1970. His service terminated on January 30, 1986, due to his death.

References

Sources
 

1900 births
1986 deaths
Lawyers from Denver
People from Keokuk, Iowa
University of Colorado alumni
University of Colorado Law School alumni
Judges of the United States District Court for the District of Colorado
United States district court judges appointed by Dwight D. Eisenhower
Judges of the United States Court of Appeals for the Tenth Circuit
United States court of appeals judges appointed by Dwight D. Eisenhower
20th-century American judges
United States Army soldiers
20th-century American lawyers
Assistant United States Attorneys